Victoria United Football Club were a Scottish football team who played in the city of Aberdeen.

They were formed in 1889 and dissolved on 14 April 1903 when they merged with Aberdeen and Orion to form the current Aberdeen F.C.

Victoria won one Northern League championship, in 1898. They also won the Rhodesia Cup, 1899–1900 and 1902–03 (contested between the three senior Aberdeen clubs: Aberdeen, Orion and Victoria United).

Playing colours

The club's colours were:

 Blue shirt
 Dark blue shorts
 Dark blue socks

Former players
1. Players that have played/managed in the Scottish Football League or any foreign equivalent to this level (i.e. fully professional league).
2. Players with full international caps.
3. Players that hold a club record or have captained the club.
 Alex Caie

Scottish Cup Record

1889–90

1890–91

References

Aberdeen F.C.
Defunct football clubs in Scotland
Association football clubs established in 1889
Association football clubs disestablished in 1903
Football clubs in Aberdeen
1889 establishments in Scotland
1903 disestablishments in Scotland